

American Music Awards
The American Music Awards is an annual major American music award show by the American Broadcasting Company. It was established in 1973. Juanes received a nomination in 2008.

|-
|2008
|Juanes
|Favorite Latin Artist
|
|}

Grammy Awards
The Grammy Award is an accolade by the National Academy of Recording Arts and Sciences of the United States to recognize outstanding achievement on the music industry. Juanes has received five nominations and won two.

|-
| 2022 || Origin || Best Latin Rock, Urban or Alternative Album || 
|-
| 2015 || Loco de Amor || rowspan="3"| Best Latin Pop Album || 
|-
| 2013 || Juanes MTV Unplugged || 
|-
| 2009 || La Vida... Es un Ratico || 
|-
| 2005 || Mi Sangre || rowspan="3"| Best Latin Rock, Urban or Alternative Album || 
|-
| 2003 || Un Día Normal || 
|-
| 2002 || Fíjate Bien ||

Latin Grammy Awards
A Latin Grammy Award is an accolade by the Latin Academy of Recording Arts & Sciences to recognize outstanding achievement in the music industry. Juanes has received twenty awards and twenty-six nominations. acreditadolo with large acrededores Calle 13 (band) Latin Grammy.

|-
| style="text-align:center;" rowspan="6"| 2001 || Juanes || Best New Artist || 
|-
|Fíjate Bien || Best Rock Solo Vocal Album || 
|-
|Fíjate Bien || Best Rock Song || 
|-
|Fíjate Bien || Album of the Year || 
|-
|Fíjate Bien || Song of the Year || 
|-
|Fíjate Bien || Best Short Form Music Video || 
|-
| style="text-align:center;" rowspan="3"| 2002 || A Dios le Pido || Song of the Year || 
|-
|A Dios le Pido || Best Rock Song || 
|-
|A Dios le Pido || Best Short Form Music Video || 
|-
| style="text-align:center;" rowspan="5"| 2003 || Un Día Normal || Album of the Year || 
|-
|'Es Por Ti || Song of the Year || 
|-
|Es Por Ti || Record of the Year || 
|-
|Un Día Normal || Best Rock Solo Vocal Album || 
|-
|Mala Gente || Best Rock Song || 
|-
|style="text-align:center;" rowspan="3"| 2005 || Mi Sangre || Best Rock Solo Vocal Album || 
|-
| Nada Valgo Sin Tu Amor || Best Rock Song || 
|-
| Volverte a Ver || Best Short Form Music Video || 
|-
| style="text-align:center;" rowspan="5"| 2008 || La Vida... Es Un Ratico || Album of the Year || 
|-
| Me Enamora || Song of the Year || 
|-
| Me Enamora || Record of the Year || 
|-
| La Vida... Es Un Ratico || Best Male Pop Vocal Album || 
|-
| Me Enamora || Best Short Form Music Video || 
|-
| 2009 || Pombo Musical || Best Latin Children's Album || 
|-
| style="text-align:center;" rowspan="4"| 2012 || Juanes MTV Unplugged || Album of the Year || 
|-
| Azul Sabina Feat. Joaquín Sabina || Song of the Year || 
|-
| Azul Sabina Feat. Joaquín Sabina || Record of the Year || 
|-
| Juanes MTV Unplugged || Best Long Form Music Video || 
|-
| style="text-align:center;" rowspan="2"| 2014 || Loco de Amor || Best Pop/Rock Album || 
|-
| Mil Pedazos || Best Rock Song || 
|-
|-
| style="text-align:center;" rowspan="1"| 2015 || Loco de Amor: La Historia || Best Long Form Music Video || 
|-
| style="text-align:center;" rowspan="3"| 2017 || Mis planes son amarte || Best Engineered Album || 
|-
| Mis planes son amarte || Best Long From Music Video || 
|-
| Mis planes son amarte || Best Rock/Pop Album || 
|-
| style="text-align:center;" rowspan="1"| 2018 || Pa' Dentro || Best Short Form Music Video || 
|-
| style="text-align:center;" rowspan="3"| 2019 || Querer Mejor (feat. Alessia Cara) || Record of the Year || 
|-
| La Plata (feat. Lalo Ebratt) || Record of the Year || 
|-
| Querer Mejor (feat. Alessia Cara) || Song of the Year || 
|-
| style="text-align:center;" rowspan="3"| 2020 ||rowspan="2"| "Bonita" (feat. Sebastián Yatra) || Song of the Year || 
|-
|| Best Pop Song || 
|-
|Más Futuro Que Pasado || Best Pop Vocal Album || 
|-
| 2021 || Origen || Album of the Year || 
|-
| 2021 || Origen || Best Rock/Pop Album || 
|-
| 2021 || Origen (Documental) || Best Long From Music Video || 
|-

MTV Awards

MTV Europe Music Awards
The MTV Europe Music Awards were established in 1994 by MTV Networks Europe to celebrate the most popular music videos in Europe. Juanes received a nomination in 2012.

|-
| style="text-align:center;" rowspan="2"| 2012 || Juanes || Best Latin America Central Act || 
|-

MTV Video Music Awards
The MTV Video Music Awards were established in the end of the summer of 1984 by MTV to celebrate the top music videos of the year. Juanes received an award from three nominations.

|-
| rowspan="2" align="center"|2002
| rowspan="2" |A Dios le Pido
| International Viewer's Choice Awards Latin America(North)
|
|-
| International Viewer's Choice Awards Latin America(Pacific)
|
|-
| style="text-align:center;" rowspan="2"| 2012 || Juanes || Best Latino Artist || 
|-

Los Premios MTV Latinoamérica
Los Premios MTV Latinoamérica or VMALA's is the Latin American version of the Video Music Awards. Kudai won five awards from sixteen nominations. Juanes received eleven awards from twenty nominations, being the male artist with more awards.

|-
| style="text-align:center;" rowspan="5"| 2002 || Juanes || Artist of the Year || 
|-
| A Dios le Pido || Video of the Year || 
|-
| Juanes || Best Male Artist || 
|-
| Juanes || Best Rock Artist || 
|-
| Juanes|| Best Artist – North || 
|-
| style="text-align:center;" rowspan="5"|2003 || Juanes || Artist of the Year || 
|-
| Fotografía (Featuring Nelly Furtado) || Video of the Year || 
|-
| Juanes || Best Solo Artist || 
|-
| Juanes || Best Rock Artist || 
|-
| Juanes|| Best Artist – Central || 
|-
| style="text-align:center;" rowspan="5"|2005 || Juanes || Artist of the Year || 
|-
| La Camisa Negra || Video of the Year || 
|-
| Juanes || Best Male Artist || 
|-
| Juanes || Best Rock Artist || 
|-
| Juanes|| Best Artist – Central || 
|-
| style="text-align:center;" rowspan="1"|2006 || Juanes|| Best Artist – Central || 
|-
| style="text-align:center;" rowspan="2"|2007 || Juanes || Fashionista – Male || 
|-
| Juanes|| Agent of Change || 
|-
| style="text-align:center;" rowspan="8"|2008 || Juanes || Artist of the Year || 
|-
| Me Enamora || Video of the Year || 
|-
| Me Enamora || Song of the Year || 
|-
| Juanes || Best Solo Artist || 
|-
| Juanes || Best Rock Artist || 
|-
| Juanes|| Best Artist – Central || 
|-
| Tres || Best Ringtone || 
|-

 Latin Billboard Music Awards
The Billboard Latin Music Awards grew out of the Billboard Music Awards program from Billboard Magazine, an industry publication charting the sales and radio airplay success of musical recordings. Juanes has received nine awards from twenty nominations.

|-
| rowspan="1" align="center"|2003
| Un Día Normal
| Latin Pop Albums-Male
|
|-
| rowspan="3" align="center"|2004
| rowspan="3" |Fotografía (Featuring Nelly Furtado)
| Best Vocal Duet or Collaboration
|
|-
| Songwriter of the Year 
|
|-
| Latin Pop Airplay Track of the Year, Duo or Group
|
|-
| rowspan="3" align="center"|2005
| rowspan="2" |Nada Valgo Sin Tu Amor
| Hot Latin Track of the Year
|
|-
| Latin Pop Airplay Track of the Year, Male
|
|-
|-
| rowspan="1" |Mi Sangre
| Latin Pop Album of the Year, Male
|
|-
| rowspan="4" align="center"|2006
| rowspan="2" |La Camisa Negra
| Hot Latin Song of the Year
|
|-
| Latin Pop Airplay Song of the Year-Male
|
|-
| rowspan="1" |Juanes
| Artist of the Year
|
|-
| rowspan="1" |Juanes
| Top Latin Albums Artist of the Year
|
|-
| rowspan="1" align="center"|2007
| rowspan="1" |Lo Que Me Gusta a Mí
| Latin Pop Airplay Song of the Year-Male
|
|-
| rowspan="6" align="center"|2008
| rowspan="1" |Juanes
| Spirit of Hope Award
|
|-
| rowspan="4" |Me Enamora
| Hot Latin Song of the Year
|
|-
| Latin Pop Airplay Song of the Year-Male
|
|-
| Latin Ringmaster of the Year
|
|-
| Latin Digital Download – Song of the Year
|
|-
| rowspan="1" |La Vida... Es Un Ratico
| Latin Pop Albums-Male
|
|-
| rowspan="2" align="center"|2009
| rowspan="1"|Juanes
| Hot Latin Songs Artist of the Year
| 
|-
| rowspan="1" |Gotas de Agua Dulce
| Latin Pop Airplay Song of the Year, Male
|
|-
| rowspan="1" align="center"|2015
| rowspan="1"|Juanes
| Album Latin Pop, Artist of the Year
| 
|-
| rowspan="1" align="center"|2018
| rowspan="1"|Juanes, Mis Planes son Amarte
| Album Latin Pop, Artist of the Year
| 
|-

Orgullosamente Latino Awards
Orgullosamente Latino Awards is the Latino awards organised by the Ritmoson Latino. The show has been held annually since 2004 and is voted on by the general public. Juanes has received two nominations in 2008

|-
| rowspan="2" align="center"|2008
| rowspan="1"|Juanes 
| Solo Artist of the year
|
|-
| rowspan="1"|La Vida... Es Un Ratico
| Latin album of the year
|
|-

LOS40 Music AwardsLOS40 Music Awards, formerly Los Premios 40 Principales, is an awards ceremony hosted annually by the Spanish radio channel Los 40. Juanes has received five awards from nine nominations, plus one of the honorary 50th Anniversary Golden Music Awards presented in 2016.

|-
| rowspan="2" align="center"|2007
| Me Enamora
| Best Latin Song
|
|-
| Juanes
| Best Latin Act
|
|-
| rowspan="2" align="center"|2008
| Gotas de Agua Dulce
| Best Latin Song
| 
|-
| Juanes
| Best Latin Act
|
|-
| rowspan="2" align="center"|2010
| Yerbatero
| Best Latin Song
| 
|-
| Juanes
| Best Latin Act
|
|-
| align="center"|2012
| Juanes
| Best Latin Act
| 
|-
| align="center" rowspan="3"|2016
| "Tu enemigo" 
| Song of the Year
| 
|-
| Juanes
| Best Latin Act
| 
|-
| Juanes
| colspan="2" | 50th Anniversary Golden Music Award

Premios 40 Principales AméricaPremios 40 Principales América is an awards ceremony hosted annually by the Spanish radio channel Los 40 Principales.

|-
| align="center"|2012
| Juanes MTV Unplugged
| Best Album
| 
|-
| align="center"|2014
| Juanes
| Best Artist or Group in Spanish
|
|-

Premios Juventud
Premios Juventud is an awards show for Spanish-speaking celebrities in the areas of film, music, sports, fashion, and pop culture, presented by the television network Univision. Juanes has received a total of eighteen nominations

|-
| rowspan="2" align="center"|2004
| rowspan="1" |A Dios le Pido
| Catchiest Tune
| 
|-
| rowspan="1" |Un Día Normal
| CD To Die For
| 
|-
| rowspan="5" align="center"|2005
| rowspan="3" |Juanes
| I Hear Him Everywhere
|
|-
| My Favorite Concert
|
|-
| Favorite Pop Artist
|
|-
| rowspan="1" |La Camisa Negra
| Catchiest Tune
|
|-
| rowspan="1" |Mi Sangre
| CD To Die For
|
|-
| rowspan="2" align="center"|2006
| rowspan="2" |Juanes
| My Favorite Concert
|
|-
| Favorite Rock Star
|
|-
| rowspan="1" align="center"|2007
| rowspan="1" |Juanes
| Favorite Rock Star
|
|-
| rowspan="5" align="center"|2008
| rowspan="1" |La Vida... Es Un Ratico
| CD to Die For
|
|-
| rowspan="1" |La Vida Tour
| My Favorite Concert
|
|-
| rowspan="1" |Me Enamora
| My Favorite Video
|
|-
| rowspan="2" |Juanes
| Favorite Rock Star
|
|-
| My Idol is...
|
|-
| rowspan="1" align="center"|2009
| rowspan="1"|Juanes
| Favorite Rock Artist
|
|-
| rowspan="1" align="center"|2010
| rowspan="1"|Juanes
| Favorite Rock Artist
|
|-
| rowspan="1" align="center"|2012
| rowspan="1"|Juanes
| Favorite Rock Artist
|
|-
| rowspan="1" align="center"|2013
| rowspan="1"|Juanes
| Favorite Rock Artist
|
|-

Premios Lo Nuestro
Premios Lo Nuestro is an awards show honoring the best of Latin music, presented by television network Univision. Juanes has received twenty-six fourteen awards nominations

|-
| rowspan="4" align="center"|2003
| rowspan="1" |Juanes
| Best Male Artist
|
|-
| rowspan="1" |A Dios le Pido
| Song of the Year
|
|-
| rowspan="1" |Un Día Normal
| Album of the Year-Rock
|
|-
| rowspan="1" |Juanes
| Best Rock Performance
|
|-
| rowspan="3" align="center"|2004
| rowspan="1" |Juanes
| Best Male Artist
|
|-
|rowspan="1"| Juanes and Nelly Furtado
| Best Duo or Group
|
|-
|rowspan="1"|Fotografía
| Video of the Year
|
|-
| rowspan="1" align="center"|2005
| rowspan="1"|Juanes
| Artist of the Year-Rock
|
|-
| rowspan="3" align="center"|2006
| rowspan="1"|La Camisa Negra
| Song of the Year
|
|-
| rowspan="1"|Juanes
| Artist of the Year-Rock
|
|-
| rowspan="1"|Nada Valgo Sin Tu Amor
| Song of the Year-Rock
|
|-
| rowspan="2" align="center"|2007
| rowspan="1"|Juanes
| Artist of the Year-Rock
|
|-
| rowspan="1"|Lo Que Me Gusta a Mí
| Song of the Year-Rock
|
|-
| rowspan="1" align="center"|2008
| rowspan="1"|Me Enamora
| Video of the Year
|
|-
| rowspan="5" align="center"|2009
| rowspan="1"|La Vida... Es Un Ratico
| Album of the Year-Rock
|
|-
| rowspan="1"|Juanes
| Artist of the Year
|
|-
| rowspan="1"|Me Enamora
| rowspan="3"|Song of the Year-Rock
|
|-
| rowspan="1"|Gotas de Agua Dulce
|
|-
| rowspan="1"|Tres
|
|-
| rowspan="1" align="center"|2010
| rowspan="1"|Juanes
| Artist of the Year-Rock
|
|-
|  rowspan="3" align="center"|2011
|  rowspan="1" |Juanes
| Artist of the Year-Rock
| 
|-
| rowspan="1"|Yerbatero
| Song of the Year
| 
|-
| rowspan="1" |Juanes
| Artist of the Year
| 
|-
| rowspan="3" align="center"|2012
| rowspan="1" |P.A.R.C.E.
| Album of the Year-Rock
| 
|-
| rowspan="1" |Y No Regresas
| Song of the Year-Rock
| 
|-
| rowspan="1" |Juanes
| Artist of the Year
| 
|-
| rowspan="4" align="center"|2013
| rowspan="1" |Juanes MTV Unplugged
| Rock/Alternative Album of the Year
| 
|-
| rowspan="1" |La Señal
| rowspan="2" |Rock/Alternative Song of the Year
| 
|-
| rowspan="1" |Me Enamora (MTV Unplugged)
| 
|-
| rowspan="1" |Juanes
| Rock/Alternative Artist of the Year
| 
|-
| rowspan="2" align="center"|2015
| rowspan="1" |Loco de Amor
| Pop Album of the Year
| 
|-
| Juanes
| Pop Male Artist of the Year
| 
|-

Premios Nuestra TierraPremios Nuestra Tierra is an annual awards show honouring the creativity and drive of Colombian artists since 2007. Juanes has received nine awards from twenty nomination, with the Colombian artist with more awards.

|-
| rowspan="8" align="center"|2008
| rowspan="4" |Juanes
| Best Public Artist
|
|-
| Best Artist Website Colombian
|
|-
| Best Artist of the Year
|
|-
| Best Pop Solo or Group of the Year
|
|-
| rowspan="1" |Juanes and Toby Tobón / El Jornalero
| Best Producer of the Year
|
|-
| rowspan="3" |Me Enamora
| Best Song of the Public
|
|-
| Pop Best Performance of the year
|
|-
| Best music video for a Colombian artist
|
|-
|-
| rowspan="4" align="center"|2009
| rowspan="1" |Juanes
| Best Pop Solo or Group of the Year
|
|-
| rowspan="2" |Odio por Amor
| Best Song of the Year
|
|-
| Pop Best Performance of the year
|
|-
| rowspan="1" |La Vida... Es Un Ratico: En Vivo
| Best Album of the Year
|
|-
| rowspan="6" align="center"|2011
| rowspan="2" |Juanes
| Best Pop Solo or Group of the Year
|
|-
| Best Public Artist
|
|-
| rowspan="1" |P.A.R.C.E.
| Best Album of the Year
|
|-
| rowspan="1" |Yerbatero
| Best music video for a Colombian artist
|
|-
| rowspan="1" |@Juanes
| Twitterer of the Year
|
|-
| rowspan="1" |https://web.archive.org/web/20080619075854/http://www.juanes.net/
| Best Internet page Colombian Artist
|
|-
| rowspan="1" align="center"|2012
| rowspan="1" |@Juanes
| Twitterer of the Year
|
|-
| rowspan="2" align="center"|2013
| rowspan="1" |Juanes
| Best Artist of the Public
|
|-
| rowspan="1" |Juanes MTV Unplugged
| Best Album of the Year
|
|-

Premios Oye!
Premios Oye! are presented annually by the Academia Nacional de la Música en México''' for outstanding achievements in Mexican record industry. Juanes has received three awards

|-
| rowspan="1" align="center"|2002
| rowspan="1"|A Dios le Pido
| Song of the Year
|
|-
| rowspan="4" align="center"|2008
| rowspan="2"|La Vida... Es Un Ratico
| Album of the Year
|
|-
| Best Male Pop
|
|-
| rowspan="2"|Me Enamora
| Record of the Year
|
|-
| Video in Spanish
|
|-

World Music Awards
The World Music Awards is an international awards show founded in 1989 that annually honors recording artists based on worldwide sales figures provided by the International Federation of the Phonographic Industry (IFPI). Juanes has received a nomination in 2006.

|-
| rowspan="1" align="center"|2006
| Juanes
| World's Best Selling Latin Artist
|
|-
| rowspan="3" align="center"|2013
| Juanes
| World's Best Male Artists
|
|-
| Juanes
| World's Best Live Act
|
|-
| Juanes
| World's Best Entertainer of the Year
|
|-

Nickelodeon's Kids Choice Awards

Nickelodeon's Kids Choice Awards México 

|-
| rowspan="1" align="center"|2012
| Juanes
| Favorite Latin Soloist
|
|-

Nickelodeon's Kids Choice Awards Indonesia 

|-
| rowspan="1" align="center"|2013
| Juanes
| Favorite Latin Artist
|
|-

Nickelodeon's Kids Choice Awards Colombia 

|-
| rowspan="1" align="center"|2014
| Juanes
| rowspan="2" align="center"|Favorite Colombian Artist
|
|-
| rowspan="2" align="center"|2015
| Juanes
|
|-
| "My Blood Foundation"
| Pro Golden Award
|
|-

 

Juanes